Rostam Batmanglij (born November 28, 1983), known mononymously as Rostam, is an American record producer, musician, singer, songwriter, and composer. He was a founding member of the band Vampire Weekend, whose first three albums he produced. He has been described by Stereogum as one of the greatest pop and indie-rock producers of his generation. Rostam also works as a solo artist and is a member of electro-soul group Discovery. He produced his first number-one album, Vampire Weekend's Contra, when he was 27 years old.

Batmanglij has been nominated for three Grammy Awards: twice for Best Alternative Music Album with Vampire Weekend (winning for Modern Vampires of the City) and once for Album of the Year as producer of Haim's Women in Music Pt. III.

Early life
Batmanglij was born to Iranian parents, and grew up in Washington, D.C. His mother is cookbook author Najmieh Batmanglij, while his father is a publisher. His parents arrived in D.C. in 1983. His brother is independent filmmaker Zal Batmanglij. The two have collaborated on multiple projects. They worked together on the film Sound of My Voice, which Rostam scored and which Zal directed and co-wrote. Rostam also composed an original piece for piano that was featured in Zal's film The East. Most recently, Rostam composed the music for both seasons of Zal's television series The OA.

Musical career

Vampire Weekend

Batmanglij majored in music at Columbia University, where he joined the band Vampire Weekend in 2006. "At Columbia, I would study classical harmony in classes and I would study music on my own, and I would try to re-create songs that I love in recordings...that was really how I learned." The name of the group comes from the movie of the same name that bandmate Ezra Koenig and his friends made over summer vacations. Batmanglij produced their self-titled debut album shortly after graduation while concurrently working multiple full-time jobs. He also produced the band's follow-up album, Contra, which sold 124,000 copies in its first week and landed atop the Billboard 200 charts. Batmanglij plays guitar, keyboard and sings in the band but also acts as a lyricist and songwriter, co-writing the song "Diplomat's Son" on Contra. Koenig has described himself and Batmanglij as "the two main songwriters in the band".

On March 18, 2013, Vampire Weekend released two songs from their album Modern Vampires of the City, "Diane Young" and "Step". Within two weeks each song had garnered more than 1 million views on YouTube. Music for both songs is credited to Batmanglij and Koenig, and lyrics are credited to Koenig. Modern Vampires of the City is the first Vampire Weekend album Batmanglij did not produce alone; for this record he collaborated with longtime friend Ariel Rechtshaid to co-produce the album together. It was released May 14, 2013.

On January 26, 2016, Batmanglij announced on Twitter that he had left Vampire Weekend to pursue solo projects, but that he would continue to collaborate with Koenig on future projects and Vampire Weekend songs.

Discovery
Batmanglij began recording with Ra Ra Riot vocalist Wes Miles on a project which was later to become Discovery. They released their debut album, LP, through XL Recordings on July 7, 2009. The album features guest vocal contributions from Koenig as well as Angel Deradoorian of Dirty Projectors.

In 2015, Batmanglij produced and contributed vocals on the song "Water" for Ra Ra Riot's fourth album, Need Your Light.

Solo work
In September 2011, Batmanglij released a solo track called "Wood". Time Out Chicagos Brent DiCrescenzo gave the song 4 out of 5 stars and wrote that "his voice pleasantly recalls a drowsy David Byrne". On November 1, 2011, Zane Lowe debuted another a solo song sung by Batmanglij called "Don't Let it Get to You" as the Hottest Record in the World on BBC Radio 1. The Fader referred to it as "a seismic event of a song". In January 2016, Batmanglij released the song "EOS" along with its music video which he had directed. On March 11, 2016, Batmanglij released the song "Gravity Don't Pull Me" along with its music video directed by himself and Josh Goleman. The video was filmed at The 1896 and features dancers Jack Grabow and Sam Asa Pratt.

On November 27, 2016, Rostam teased his new solo album, which was to be released in 2017. In the spring of 2017, Rostam released two songs from the album: "Gwan", released on April 26, and "Bike Dream", released on June 14. With the release of "Bike Dream", Rostam revealed that his debut solo album would be titled Half-Light and released on September 8, 2017.

On September 12, 2018, Rostam self-released a new single, "In a River". On October 15, 2020, Rostam self-released another new single, "Unfold You".

On February 2, 2021, Rostam self-released a single, "These Kids We Knew", and teased an upcoming album release. Exactly one month later, Batmanglij confirmed the release of his second solo album, titled Changephobia, on June 4, as well as releasing a single from the album called "4Runner".

Collaborative work
In 2010, Converse released "All Summer", produced by Batmanglij and featuring Kid Cudi and Bethany Cosentino of Best Coast.

Batmanglij produced and co-wrote two songs for the Walkmen frontman Hamilton Leithauser's solo album, Black Hours, which was released in June 2014. Also in 2014, Batmanglij produced two songs for singer Charli XCX. The song "Need Ur Luv" appears on her album Sucker, and the song "Kingdom", featuring Simon Le Bon, appears on The Hunger Games: Mockingjay, Part 1 – Original Motion Picture Soundtrack. In December 2014, Batmanglij along with Diplo and Ed Droste remixed Ty Dolla Sign's "Stand For" into a new song titled "Long Way Home". Batmanglij also wrote original music for a play by Kenneth Lonergan called This Is Our Youth, starring Kieran Culkin, Michael Cera, and Tavi Gevinson, which premiered on Broadway in 2014.

In 2015, Batmanglij worked alongside Canadian singer Carly Rae Jepsen on her third studio album, Emotion. In an interview with Stereogum, Jepsen described working with Batmanglij as writing with a musician she admires, and said that together they had made "what’s maybe one of [her] favorite songs" on the record. Batmanglij produced and co-wrote the fourth single, "Warm Blood", which was released on July 31, 2015. Emotion was released worldwide on August 21, 2015.

In 2016, he formed Hamilton Leithauser + Rostam with Hamilton Leithauser of the Walkmen. They released the single "1000 Times" in July 2016, which they performed on The Late Show with Stephen Colbert on September 12, 2016. Their song "In a Black Out" was featured in a commercial for the Apple iPhone 7. Their debut album, I Had a Dream That You Were Mine, was released on September 23, 2016.

Batmanglij produced and co-wrote the song "Listen to Your Friends" from English singer Declan McKenna's debut album, What Do You Think About the Car?, which was released in July 2017.

Personal life
Batmanglij is gay and talked about his sexual orientation in the magazine Out. In an Instagram post in 2015, he said that Ed Droste of the band Grizzly Bear influenced his decision to publicly come out.

Discography

Solo work

Albums 

Half-Light (2017)
Changephobia (2021)

Singles

With Vampire Weekend 

 Vampire Weekend (2008)
 Contra (2010)
 Modern Vampires of the City (2013)

As primary producer 
Discovery
 LP (2009)

Hamilton Leithauser and Rostam
 I Had a Dream That You Were Mine (2016)

Clairo
 Immunity (2019)
Haim
 Women in Music Pt. III (2020)

Other contributions

Compositions for film and theatre 

 Sound of My Voice (2011) – film score
 The East (2013) – "Doc's Song" (original piano composition for the film)
 This Is Our Youth (Steppenwolf production on Broadway, fall 2014) – original score
 The OA (television series) (2016) – main theme and score
 The Persian Version (2023) – score

References

1983 births
Living people
American indie rock musicians
American people of Iranian descent
Columbia College (New York) alumni
Columbia University School of the Arts alumni
Dirty Projectors members
Gay singers
American LGBT singers
American LGBT songwriters
Grammy Award winners
American LGBT people of Asian descent
LGBT people from Washington, D.C.
Gay songwriters
American gay musicians
Musicians from Washington, D.C.
Vampire Weekend members
Glassnote Records artists
20th-century American LGBT people
21st-century American LGBT people
American gay writers